This article presents a list of the historical events and publications of Australian literature during 1962.

Major publications

Books 

 James Aldridge – A Captive in the Land
 Thea Astley – The Well Dressed Explorer
 Martin Boyd – When Blackbirds Sing
 Jon Cleary – The Country of Marriage
 Dymphna Cusack – Picnic Races
 Catherine Gaskin – I Know My Love
 George Johnston – The Far Road
 Elizabeth Kata – Someone Will Conquer Them
 John Naish – The Cruel Field
 John O'Grady – Gone Fishin Nancy Phelan – The River and the Brook
 George Turner – The Cupboard Under the Stairs
 Arthur Upfield – The Will of the Tribe

 Short stories 

 Thea Astley – "The Scenery Never Changes"
 Peter Cowan – "The Island"
 John Morrison – Twenty-Three : Stories
 Hal Porter
 A Bachelor's Children : Short Stories
 "A Double Because It's Snowing"
 "First Love"
 "Francis Silver"
 Patrick White
 "Be Kind to Titina"
 "The Letters"
 "Willy-Wagtails by Moonlight"
 Amy Witting – "The Weight of a Man"

 Children's and Young Adult fiction 

 Nan Chauncy – Half a World Away
 John Gunn – City in Danger
 Ruth Park
 The Muddle-Headed Wombat
 The Road Under the Sea
 Joan Phipson
 The Boundary Riders
 The Family Conspiracy
 Ivan Southall – Hills End
 P. L. Travers – Mary Poppins from A to Z
 Joan Woodberry – Rafferty Makes a Landfall
 Judith Wright – Range the Mountains High
 Patricia Wrightson – The Feather Star

 Poetry 

 David Campbell – Poems
 Bruce Dawe – No Fixed Address : Poems
 Geoffrey Dutton – Flowers and Fury : Poems
 R. D. Fitzgerald – Southmost Twelve
 Rodney Hall – Penniless Till Doomsday
 Gwen Harwood – "The Wine is Drunk"
 Oodgeroo Noonuccal – "Colour Bar"
 Roland Robsinson – Deep Well
 Douglas Stewart – Rutherford and Other Poems
 Randolph Stow – Outrider : Poems, 1956-1962
 Francis Webb
 "Harry"
 "Pneumo-Encephalograph"
 Judith Wright – Birds : Poems

 Biography 

 Miles Franklin – Childhood at Brindabella : My First Ten Years
 Joan Lindsay – Time Without Clocks
 Douglas Lockwood – I, the Aboriginal
 Alan Marshall – This is the Grass

 Non-fiction 

 Manning Clark – The History of Australia (Vol. 1)

 Drama 

 Morris West – Daughter of Silence
 Patrick White – The Season at Sarsaparilla

Awards and honours

Literary

Children and Young Adult

Poetry

 Births 

A list, ordered by date of birth (and, if the date is either unspecified or repeated, ordered alphabetically by surname) of births in 1962 of Australian literary figures, authors of written works or literature-related individuals follows, including year of death.

 17 April — Joanna Murray-Smith, playwrightUnknown date Matthew Condon, novelist
 Alison Croggon, novelist
 Luke Davies, novelist
 Craig Sherborne, poet and playwright

 Deaths 

A list, ordered by date of death (and, if the date is either unspecified or repeated, ordered alphabetically by surname) of deaths in 1962 of Australian literary figures, authors of written works or literature-related individuals follows, including year of birth.

 8 March – Jean Devanny, novelist (born 1894)
 9 September – H. M. Green, poet and critic (born 1881)
 3 December – Mary Gilmore, poet (born 1865)Unknown date'
 Margaret Fane, novelist and poet (born 1887)

See also 
 1962 in Australia
 1962 in literature
 1962 in poetry
 List of years in Australian literature
List of years in literature

References

 
Australian literature by year
20th-century Australian literature
1962 in literature